Michael David Kwan (1934–2001) is the author of Things That Must Not Be Forgotten, which has won the Kiriyama Prize, as well as three other books.

He was also an accomplished translator of Chinese literature into English.

References 

1934 births
2001 deaths
20th-century translators